Lycian may refer to:

 Lycia, a geopolitical region in Anatolia (now Turkey);
 Lycian Apollo, a type of ancient Greek statuary;
 Lycian Way, a hiking trail in southwestern Turkey;
 Lycian Way Ultramarathon, an annual ultra-marathon in Lycian Way ;
 Lycians, people who lived in Lycia;
 extinct languages formerly spoken in Lycia, i.e.
 the Lycian alphabet, used to write the Lycian language;
 Lycian (Unicode block), the Unicode characters comprising the Lycian script

See also
 Lucian (disambiguation)
 Lycia (disambiguation)

Language and nationality disambiguation pages